Countess Anna Charlotte Dorothea von Medem (3 February 1761 – 20 August 1821) was born a Gräfin (Countess) of the noble German Baltic Medem family and later became Duchess of Courland. Popularly known as Dorothea of Courland after her marriage to Peter von Biron, the last Duke of Courland, she hosted an aristocratic salon in Berlin and performed various diplomatic duties on behalf of her estranged husband. She would spend the rest of her life in her estate in Löbichgau, where she would invite and host many important political and cultural figures of the time and make many acquaintances, ranging from Goethe over Napoleon I of France to Talleyrand, the latter of whom she was reportedly very close.

Biography
Anna Charlotte Dorothea was born at Mežotne to Johann Friedrich von Medem, a Graf from the old Courland nobility, general-poruchik of the Russian Empire, and (as of 1779) Reichsgraf of the Holy Roman Empire; and his second wife, Louise Charlotte von Manteuffel. Her father, a descendant of Konrad von Mandern, was himself awarded the Order of St. Alexander Nevsky in 1774 for his help in preparing the Treaty of Küçük Kaynarca. He owned many estates in Courland, including Elley and Alt-Autz. Her elder half sister from her father's previous marriage was the poet Elisa von der Recke. Her younger brother was Russian diplomat Christoph Johann von Medem, who built Villa Medem in Mitau (now Jelgava).

Duchess of Courland
On 6 November 1779, eighteen-year-old Dorothea became the third wife of the 55-year-old, childless Duke Peter von Biron, son of the famous Ernst Johann von Biron. The couple had six children, two of whom died in infancy. The four surviving children were all daughters; however, the youngest one, Dorothea, was probably not fathered by; although recognized by the Duke.

Dorothea was welcomed into the highest social circles thanks to her new status as duchess as well as her beauty. Because her husband was preoccupied with political difficulties at home involving his overlord the King of Poland and the Courland nobility, he frequently sent her on diplomatic missions to Warsaw, lasting months at a time, and to Berlin, Karlovy Vary, and Saint Petersburg for shorter periods. During these long absences Dorothea became alienated from her husband and had numerous love affairs with other men, including Gustaf Mauritz Armfelt, Talleyrand, and the Polish nobleman, Count Alexander Benedykt Batowski, who allegedly fathered her fourth daughter, born in 1793. After the year she gave birth to her daughter, also named Dorothea (whom her husband nevertheless acknowledged as his own), the Duchess moved permanently to the Palais Kurland in Berlin, where she held an aristocratic salon.

Later life
In 1794 she acquired the Gutsherrschaft Löbichau in Altenburgischen and spent her summers at the newly built Schloss there. Inviting poets, philosophers, relatives and friends to Löbichau, it became known as the Musenhof der Herzogin von Kurland. Her half-sister Elisa von der Recke, who would later be linked with Christoph August Tiedge, came to Löbichau to live and Tsar Alexander I of Russia, Frederick William III of Prussia, Napoleon I of France, Talleyrand, Metternich, Goethe, Schiller and other personalities of the time were the duchess's personal friends. In 1801, she received a proposal from Prince Frederick Adolf of Sweden.

Upon her youngest daughter Dorothea's marriage to Talleyrand's nephew, Edmond de Talleyrand-Périgord, in 1809, the duchess moved to Paris, having an intense relationship with Talleyrand and influenced him to turn against Napoleon. In 1814 she traveled to the Congress of Vienna to confront him about his alleged love affair with her daughter Dorothea. A few years after her death at Löbichau in 1821, the Duchess' body was moved from her place of death to the family vault at Sagan where her husband was buried in 1800.

Issue
With Peter von Biron:
 Wilhelmine, Duchess of Sagan, Princess of Rohan, Princess Trubetskoy, Countess von der Schulenburg, mistress of Klemens Wenzel, Prince von Metternich
 Pauline, Duchess of Sagan and Princess of Hohenzollern-Hechingen
 Johanna Katharina, Duchess of Acerenza
 Peter (23 February 1787 – 25 March 1790)
 Charlotte (21 January 1789 – 10 March 1791)

With Alexander Batowski:
 Dorothea, Duchess of Talleyrand-Périgord, Duchess of Dino, Duchess of Sagan, protégé (and alleged mistress) of Talleyrand and wife of his nephew the 2nd Duke of Talleyrand

Gallery

Bibliography
 Elisa von der Recke: Tagebücher und Selbstzeugnisse. Leipzig 1984
 : Drei Sommer in Löbichau 1819–21. Stuttgart 1877
 Philip Ziegler: Die Herzogin von Dino, Talleyrands letzte Vertraute. München 1965
 Clemens Brühl: Die Sagan. Berlin 1941
 Sabine und Klaus Hofmann: Zwischen Metternich und Talleyrand. Der Musenhof der Herzogin von Kurland im Schloss zu Löbichau. Museum Burg Posterstein, 2004
 Christoph August Tiedge: Anna Charlotte Dorothea. Letzte Herzogin von Kurland. F. A. Brockhaus, Leipzig 1823  Online-Version at Internet Archive

Notes

External links

https://web.archive.org/web/20070928121332/http://www.burg-posterstein.de/startframes/historietopframe.htm

1761 births
1821 deaths
People from Mežotne
People from the Duchy of Courland and Semigallia
Baltic-German people
Baltic nobility
Duchesses of Courland
Dorothea
German salon-holders
18th-century Latvian people